Score Media Inc. was a Canadian media company. Partially owned by Alliance Atlantis and later Canwest, its  main asset was The Score, a national specialty television service providing sports news, information, highlights, live events, and other sports-related entertainment programming. The company also owns closed captioning service Voice to Visual Inc., and mixed martial arts promotion The Score Fighting Series.

Prior to 19 October 2012, the company also owned a 20% stake in mobile and web development firm NuLayer, and various interactive properties including ScoreMobile, ScoreMobile FC, SportsTap and TheScore.ca. These properties are now owned by theScore Inc. The company also previously owned and operated The Score Satellite Radio; a satellite radio network available across North America on Sirius Satellite Radio. The station shut down on 1 September 2011.

The company was founded in 1997 as Headline Media Group Inc. by Shaw Communications and Levy family. Shaw Media was spun off to form Corus Entertainment in September 1999 and sold 48% stake to Alliance Atlantis the following month. In February 2005, it changed its name to Score Media Inc. AAC’s stake was acquired by Canwest in 2007.

Sale to Rogers

On 24 August 2012, reports surfaced that Rogers Communications was planning to acquire Score Media for close to $160 million. The next day, those reports became reality when Rogers Media announced that it will acquire Score Media in a transaction valued at $167 million.

The acquisition itself closed on 19 October 2012, at which point Score Media's digital assets were spun off into another company, theScore Inc., in which Rogers Media initially retained a 10% interest. Score Media's TV properties were immediately placed into a blind trust, under trustee Peter Viner, pending final CRTC approval, which came on 30 April 2013.

References

External links
 Ownership of Score Media Inc.

Defunct broadcasting companies of Canada
Radio broadcasting companies of Canada
Companies based in Toronto
Mass media companies disestablished in 2013
Companies formerly listed on the Toronto Stock Exchange